Christian Bernardi (born 15 August 1970 in San Marino) is a Sammarinese athlete.

He is a wheelchair athlete, who has competed as an amateur in handbike marathons in Venice, Rome, Berlin and New York, and who also practices wheelchair tennis and the shot put. He was selected, through a wild card invitation, to be San Marino's sole representative for the country's first ever participation at the Paralympic Games. At the 2012 Summer Paralympics in London, he competed in the shot put, in the men's F54-56 disability category (for wheelchair athletes). He finished 19th and last, with a throw of 4.54 metres, significantly behind the other competitors.

References 

1970 births
Living people
Sammarinese shot putters
Sammarinese male athletes
Male wheelchair racers
Sammarinese wheelchair racers
Male shot putters